Kalani is both a surname and a given name. Some notable people with the name include:

Surname
 Hemu Kalani (1923–1943), Indian revolutionary
 Pappu Kalani (born 1951), Indian criminal and politician
 Mohammad Jafar Kalani (born 1928), Iranian shooter
 Hossein Kalani (born 1940), Iranian football player
 Jyoti Kalani, Indian politician

Given name
 Kalani Hilliker (born 2000), American dancer
 Kalani Sitake (born 1975), Tongan football coach
 Kalani Brown (born 1997), American professional basketball player
 Kalani Pe'a (born 1983), singer
 Kalani Das, American percussionist

See also
 Kalani (disambiguation)